The Spokane Jets were a senior men's ice hockey team that played out of Spokane, Washington. They played in the Western International Hockey League (WIHL) from 1963-64 through 1973-74.

Prior to 1963 the Spokane Flyers were the city's entry in the WIHL. The Spokane Jets were renamed the Flyers in 1974.

In 1969–70, the Spokane Jets became the first United States-based team to win the Allan Cup.

Championships
1967-68, WIHL title and the British Columbia senior championship
1968-69, WIHL title and the British Columbia senior championship
1969-70, WIHL title and the British Columbia senior championship
1969-70, Allan Cup
1971-72, WIHL title and the British Columbia senior championship
1971-72, Allan Cup
1972-73, WIHL title and the British Columbia senior championship

References

Western International Hockey League teams
Ice hockey teams in Washington (state)
Sports in Spokane, Washington